Sun Baked Snow Cave is a collaborative album between Japanese experimental doom band Boris and Japanese noise musician Merzbow. The album consists of a single track that clocks in at over an hour in length. The album artwork was done by Sunn O))) member and regular Hydra Head designer Stephen O'Malley.

Composition
Structurally, the album has three distinct sections: the opening 18 minutes consist primarily of quiet, sparse acoustic guitar strums backed by distant whirs and machine noises; a lengthy crossfade shifts the album into drone doom metal, with Merzbow's accentuation via harsh noise layers; eventually, the loud half-hour settles through movements of noise into 6 minutes of a quiet electric guitar and ambience coda.

Release
In 2014, the album was released as a double LP. Released as a limited edition of 1,200 copies pressed on black, white, electric blue, or clear with blue streaks vinyl. Initially available on August 16, 2014 as a limited release on the Hydra Head online store and from Boris on tour. A general release followed on September 23. It was repressed in March 2015 on clear/blue splatter in an edition of 500 copies.

Track listing

Personnel
Boris with Merzbow
Masami Akita – computer
Takeshi – guitar, bass guitar
Wata – guitar, echo
Atsuo – feedback conduction, computer
Production
Fangs Anal Satan – mixing
Stephen O'Malley – artwork

Notes
Mastering at Peace Music 6 October 2004

Release history

References

2005 albums
Collaborative albums
Boris (band) albums
Merzbow albums
Hydra Head Records albums